Stuart Saunders may refer to:

Stuart Saunders (academic), Vice-Chancellor of the University of Cape Town in 1981-1996
Stuart Saunders (actor), appeared in 1960 film Dentist in the Chair
 Stuart Saunders (cricketer) (born 1960), Australian cricketer
Stuart Saunders (rugby union) (1883–1973), played for Guy's Hospital Football Club and the British Lions tour of 1904
Stuart T. Saunders (1909–1987), American railroad executive

See also
Stuart Saunders Hogg (1833–1921), British civil servant in India
Stuart Saunders Smith (born 1948), American composer, percussionist and poet